Periyapet is a locality of Vaniyambadi in Vellore District, Tamil Nadu. It is located near to the branch of river Palar. There are 4 mosques and 1 temple located here. Azhagu Perumal Temple is one of the famous temple of Vaniyambadi is located here. Villages like Old Vaniyambadi, Nadupettarai etc. are located next to the branch of river Palar. Periyapet is located nearly 1.5 km from Vaniyambadi Bus stand and Vaniyambadi Railway Station

Educational Institutions at Periyapet 

The following list of schools are present at Periyapet

1. Madarasa -e- faizul aam
2. Madarasatul-banath
3. Municipal Elementary School

Places to see at Periyapet 
Masthan Dargah, one of the most old and famous dargah of Vaniyambadi, is located here. Each year, the birth of the saint Masthan Baba is celebrated here. People from all over Tamil Nadu come to see this Dargah.

Transportation at Periyapet 
Mini Bus facility is available from here to go to Vaniyambadi and villages like Ramanaickenpettai, Ambalur, Kodayanchi, Dasiriyappanur etc.,

External links
Periyapet community
Location of Periyapet

Villages in Vellore district